William Harold Crump (10 February 1873 – 31 January 1918) was an English professional footballer who played as a left half in the Football League for Luton Town and Wolverhampton Wanderers. He also played in the Southern League for Tottenham Hotspur.

Career statistics

References

1873 births
English footballers
Sportspeople from Smethwick
Brentford F.C. players
English Football League players
Association football wing halves
Tottenham Hotspur F.C. players
1943 deaths
Hereford Thistle F.C. players
Luton Town F.C. players
Doncaster Rovers F.C. players
Thames Ironworks F.C. players
Watford F.C. players
Southern Football League players
Midland Football League players
Wolverhampton Wanderers F.C. players